was the head of the Shō family, the former Ryūkyūan royal family. Like most members of the kazoku system of peerage, and all heads of the Shō family since the abolition of the Ryukyu Kingdom, he lived in Tokyo for his whole life.

Life
Hiroshi Shō was born the eldest son of Shō Shō with Momoko Ogasawara. Upon his father's death on 19 June 1923, and at the age of five, he became head of the family and inherited the family title of Marquess. He graduated from Tokyo Imperial University earning a degree in East Asian history from the Department of Literature.

He served for a time as a captain in the Japanese Imperial Navy. He was also active in the business world, working with various institutions, including Shō Enterprises, where he was representative director. He lost his title, as did all other members of the kazoku system of peerage, with the implementation of the post-war Constitution of Japan in 1947.

Late in life, in the 1990s, Shō donated many Shō family possessions, including artworks, ritual objects, historical documents, the royal mausoleum of Tamaudun and royal gardens of Shikina-en to the City of Naha. He also donated artworks, documents, and other family possessions to the city of Urasoe and village of Izena. Shō died on 30 August 1996. His funeral was held in Tokyo, though he was entombed in Izena Tamaudun on the Okinawan island of Izena. His son, Mamoru Shō (尚衞), became head of the royal Shō family afterwards.

Family

 Father: Shō Shō (1888-1923)
 Mother: Momoko Ogasawara (1896-1950)
 Wives:
 Tozawa Eiko (1919-1945)
 Keiko (b.1920)
 Children: four daughters and one son
 Kazuko (b.1943)
 Yoshiko (b.1945)
 Keiko (b.1947) married Kabaya Nozu
 Kaoru (b.1949)
Mamoru Shō (b. 1950)

Ancestry

References

|-

Kazoku
People from Naha
Second Shō dynasty
1918 births
1996 deaths
University of Tokyo alumni
Pretenders